Alf Blütecher (7 February 1880 – 5 March 1959) was a Norwegian actor. He appeared in more than eighty films from 1913 to 1930.

Selected filmography

References

External links

1880 births
1959 deaths
People from Tokke
Norwegian male silent film actors
Norwegian male stage actors
20th-century Norwegian male actors